An osmotic coefficient  is a quantity which characterises the deviation of a solvent from ideal behaviour, referenced to Raoult's law. It can be also applied to solutes. Its definition depends on the ways of expressing chemical composition of mixtures.

The osmotic coefficient based on molality m is defined by:

and on a mole fraction basis by:

The latter osmotic
coefficient is sometimes called the rational osmotic coefficient. The values for the two definitions are different, but since

the two definitions are similar, and in fact both approach 1 as the concentration goes to zero.

Applications 
For liquid solutions, the osmotic coefficient is often used to calculate the salt activity coefficient from the solvent activity, or vice versa. For example, freezing point depression measurements, or measurements of deviations from ideality for other colligative properties, allows calculation of the salt activity coefficient through the osmotic coefficient.

Relation to other quantities
In a single solute solution, the (molality based) osmotic coefficient and the solute activity coefficient  are related to the excess Gibbs free energy  by the relations:

and there is thus a differential relationship between them (temperature and pressure held constant):

Liquid electrolyte solutions 
For a single salt solute with molal activitiy, the osmotic coefficient can be written as where  is the stochiometric number of salt and  the activity of the solvent.  can be calculated from the salt activity coefficient via:

Moreover, the activity coefficient of the salt  can be calculated from:

 

This means that, at least at low concentrations, the vapor pressure of the solvent will be greater than that predicted by Raoult's law. For instance, for solutions of magnesium chloride, the vapor pressure is slightly greater than that predicted by Raoult's law up to a concentration of 0.7 mol/kg, after which the vapor pressure is lower than Raoult's law predicts. For aqueous solutions, the osmotic coefficients can be calculated theoretically by Pitzer equations or TCPC model.

See also
 Bromley equation
 Pitzer equation
 Davies equation
 van 't Hoff factor
 Law of dilution
 Thermodynamic activity
 Ion transport number

References

Physical chemistry